Kentucky Route 644 (KY 644) is a  state highway in Lawrence County, Kentucky, that runs from KY 2565 to KY 2 south of Louisa.

Major intersections

References

0644
0644